Gorgonidia withfordi is a moth of the family Erebidae first described by Walter Rothschild in 1910. It is found in Brazil, French Guiana, Guyana, Ecuador, Peru, Bolivia and Honduras.

References

 

Phaegopterina
Moths described in 1910